Juncus oxymeris, common name pointed rush is a species of rush native to the West Coast of North America (British Columbia, Washington, Oregon and California).

Leaves are gladiolate, i.e., flattened with one edge toward the stem, similar to those of Iris or Gladiolus. Flowers are straw-colored, with lanceolate tepals.

References

oxymeris
Flora of California
Flora of Oregon
Flora of British Columbia
Flora of Washington (state)
Flora without expected TNC conservation status